Henry FitzJames (6 August 1673 – 16 December 1702), titular 1st Duke of Albemarle in the Jacobite peerage, was the illegitimate son of King James II of England and VII of Scotland by Arabella Churchill, sister of the first Duke of Marlborough.

Life
FitzJames was born in St. James's Square, Westminster, then in the county of Middlesex, England. He was the brother of James FitzJames, 1st Duke of Berwick, the French Marshal. He was also the brother of Henrietta FitzJames and Arabella FitzJames, who was named after her mother and became a nun.

On 20 July 1700, he married Marie Gabrielle d'Audibert de Lussan, daughter and heiress of Jean d'Audibert, Comte de Lussan and  Marie Françoise Raimond. He had a posthumous daughter, Lady Christine Marie Jacqueline Henriette FitzJames, born 29 May 1703 at Bagnols sur Cèze, Languedoc, France, who became a nun. His widow remarried in May 1707, at Saint-Germain-en-Laye, to John Drummond, Marquess of Forth, later 2nd Duke of Melfort (1682–1754).

Unrecognized title
FitzJames was created Duke of Albemarle, together with the subsidiary titles of Earl of Rochford and Baron Romney, by his father on 13 January 1696, but the title is only recognized by Jacobites. He was also appointed the Grand Prior of the revived Priory of the English Commandery of the Sovereign Military Order of St. John of Jerusalem, Rhodes and Malta, known as the Knights of Malta.

Ancestry

Notes

References
Ruvigny and Raineval, Henry Melville de Massue de Ruvigny, Marquis of, The Jacobite Peerage, Edinburgh, 1904.

1673 births
1702 deaths
17th-century English nobility
18th-century English people
Henry
Illegitimate children of James II of England
People from Westminster
Henry
Dukes in the Jacobite peerage
Peers created by James II (1689–1701)
Sons of kings